Charitoprepes apicipicta is a moth in the family Crambidae. It was described by Hiroshi Inoue in 1963 in the genus Heterocnephes, and was later moved to its current genus. The species is found in Japan (Honshu), China and Korea.

The wingspan is 21–24 mm. The ground colour of the forewings is dark brown with a large dark brown discoidal dot and a large dark brown apical dot. The ground colour of the hindwings is brown. Adults are flying from May to June and again from August to September in two generations in Japan.

References

Moths described in 1963
Pyraustinae